Tworki is a district of Pruszków, a town on the outskirts of Warsaw, Poland. It is famous for the large psychiatric hospital, which opened in 1891 and is still operating to this day as a part of the Medical University of Warsaw. It is the site of one of the stations of the Warszawska Kolej Dojazdowa (WKD) commuter railway.

External links
 Tworki Hospital

Pruszków County